The 2012 United States Senate election in Florida  was held on November 6, 2012, alongside a presidential election, other elections to the House and Senate, as well as various state and local elections. The primary election was held August 14, 2012. Incumbent Democratic U.S. Senator Bill Nelson won reelection to a third term, defeating Republican U.S. Representative Connie Mack IV (whose father, Connie Mack III was Nelson's direct predecessor in that Senate seat) by 13%, winning 55% to 42%. Nelson defeated Mack by over 1 million votes.

Until Donald Trump won 4.6 million votes in the 2016 presidential election and Marco Rubio won 4.8 million votes in the 2016 Senate election, Nelson recorded the most votes in Florida history. , this was the last time that a Democrat won a U.S. Senate election in Florida and the last time a U.S. Senate election in Florida was called at poll closing. This is also the last time a Democrat carried the following counties in a statewide election: Brevard, Flagler, Franklin, Hamilton, Hendry, Hernando, Liberty, Madison, Manatee, Marion, Okeechobee, Pasco, Polk, Sarasota, and Volusia.

Democratic primary

Candidates 
 Bill Nelson, incumbent U.S. Senator
 Glenn Burkett

Results

Republican primary

Candidates

Qualified 
 Connie Mack IV, U.S. Representative
 Mike McCalister, university professor and candidate for governor in 2010
 Marielena Stuart, conservative activist and journalist
 Dave Weldon, former U.S. Representative

Withdrew 
 Alexander George, businessman, political activist and minister
 Mike Haridopolos, President of the Florida Senate
 Adam Hasner, former Florida House of Representatives majority leader (Running for U.S. House of Representatives)
 Craig Miller, former CEO of Ruth's Chris Steak House and unsuccessful 2010 candidate for the U.S. House of Representatives (Running for U.S. House of Representatives)
 Ron Rushing, businessman (Running for state senate)
 George LeMieux, former U.S. Senator

Declined 
 Jeffrey Atwater, Chief Financial Officer of Florida
 Allan Bense, former Speaker of the Florida House of Representatives
 Vern Buchanan, U.S. Representative
 Jeb Bush, former Florida governor
 Dean Cannon, Speaker of the Florida House of Representatives
 Nicholas M. Loeb, businessman
 Will McBride, attorney and candidate for the U.S. Senate in 2006
 Tom Rooney, U.S. Representative
 Chris Ruddy, founder and CEO of Newsmax
 Allen West, U.S. Representative

Polling

Endorsements

Results

General election 
From a long way out, Nelson appeared to be vulnerable, with some earlier polls showing Mack leading. However, in the last few weeks with new polls conducted, it appeared as though Nelson was headed for a victory. The last poll placed him five percentage points ahead of Mack; Nelson would win easily by 13 percentage points. Nelson performed well in Southeast Florida (the Miami area), Tampa, Gainesville, typically Democratic areas. Nelson however managed to win in areas that typically lean Republican. For example, Nelson won in Duval County home of Jacksonville, and Volusia County home of Daytona Beach. Nelson's ability to outperform President Obama led to him winning the election easily. Obama would still win Florida, but by just about 74,000 votes, and less than a percentage point. Nelson began his third term in the Senate on January 3, 2013.

Candidates 
 Bill Nelson (Democratic), incumbent U.S. Senator
 Connie Mack IV (Republican), U.S. Congressman
 Chris Borgia (Independent), Iraq War Veteran
 Bill Gaylor (Independent), owner, Bill and Sheila Gaylor Insurance

Debates 
Only one debate was held, hosted by Leadership Florida/Florida Press Association occurred on October 17 at the Nova Southeastern University campus in Davie.
 Complete video of debate, October 17, 2012 - C-SPAN

Fundraising

Top contributors

Top industries

Independent expenditures 
In early October 2012, Crossroads GPS announced it would launch a $16 million advertising buy in national races, of which four were this and three other Senate elections. In Florida, the money was to be spent by its affiliate, American Crossroads.

Predictions

Polling 

Republican primary

General election

Results

By congressional district
Nelson won 20 of 27 congressional districts.

See also 
 2012 United States Senate elections
 2012 United States House of Representatives elections in Florida
2012 United States presidential election in Florida

References

External links 
 Florida Secretary of State – Division of Elections
 Campaign contributions at OpenSecrets.org
 Outside spending at Sunlight Foundation
 Candidate issue positions at On the Issues

Official campaign websites (Archived)
 Chris Borgia for U.S. Senate
 Connie Mack for U.S. Senate
 Mike McCalister for U.S. Senate
 Ron McNeil for U.S. Senate
 Bill Nelson for U.S. Senate
 Marielena Stuart for U.S. Senate
 Dave Weldon for U.S. Senate

2012 Florida elections
Florida
2012